"No Sleep" is a song by Australian alternative rock band, Jebediah. The song was released in August 2004 as the second and final single from the band's fourth studio album, Braxton Hicks.

Radio airplay
During August, "No Sleep", became the second most played alternative single on Australian radio, with the video receiving airplay on Rage, Video Hits, VH1 and MTV Australia.

Music video
The music video for the song features the band on the rooftop of a building in Sydney, Australia. The performance of the song occurs over the course of an entire evening until sunrise.

Compilation albums
It is featured on the 2006 WAMi dual disc compilation, Kiss My WAMi 2006, with the audio on the CD album and its video on the DVD.

Track listing

References 

2004 singles
Jebediah songs
2004 songs
Songs written by Kevin Mitchell (musician)